Meshulam Eliezer Leifer (born January 23, 1979) is the fourth Rebbe of the Pittsburgh Hasidic dynasty. He succeeded his father, Grand Rabbi Mordechai Yissachar Ber Leifer, upon the latter's death in October 2020.

Early life, family, and education
Meshulam Eliezer Leifer was born on January 23, 1979, in the United States. He is the eldest of the three sons of the third Pittsburgher Rebbe, Grand Rabbi Mordechai Yissachar Ber Leifer, and his wife Miriam Aviva Leifer (née Liebes). He has five sisters. He was named after Rabbi Meshulam Yissachar Klieger of Kraków, the father-in-law of his maternal grandfather; the name Eliezer (after Rabbi Meshulam Yissachar's father-in-law, Rabbi Eliezer Pesil, a Dzhikover Hasid) was added since Rabbi Meshulam Yissachar had died young in the Holocaust.

Leifer is a direct descendant of Rabbi Mordechai of Nadvorna, the founder of the Nadvorna dynasty, who was the great-grandson of Grand Rabbi Meir the Great of Premishlan, a disciple of the Baal Shem Tov. His paternal great-grandfather, Grand Rabbi Yosef Leifer, established the Pittsburgh Hasidic dynasty in Pittsburgh, Pennsylvania, in the late 1920s, and his grandfather, Grand Rabbi Avraham Abba Leifer, moved the Hasidut to Ashdod, Israel, in 1970. 

His family made aliyah to Israel in the early 1980s. They first lived in Telzstone, where Leifer attended a Talmud Torah. After they moved to Ashdod to be near his grandfather in 1987, Leifer attended a Belz Talmud Torah in that city. Following his Bar Mitzvah, he advanced to the Chug Chasam Sofer yeshiva in Bnei Brak. His father acceded to the leadership of the Hasidut in 1990.

Early career
Leifer was considered his father's "right-hand man" and confidant. He assisted his father in the management and funding of all the Pittsburgher institutions in Ashdod, which include schools, yeshivas, and charitable institutions. The Pittsburgher Hasidut numbers nearly 200 families in Ashdod, and also has followers in Jerusalem, Bnei Brak, Beit Hilkia, New York City, and California. In the 2010s, Leifer began working with young men who were weak in their faith, strengthening them and drawing them closer to Torah and Hasidut.

Leifer is considered a significant scholar of Torah and Hasidut, and is versed in mussar works as well. He has authored several books on Hasidut and the history of spiritual leaders throughout the generations. He also edited and proofread his father's writings before their publication.

As Rebbe
Leifer was appointed to succeed his father as Pittsburger Rebbe at the latter's funeral on October 5, 2020.

Personal life
Leifer is currently married to the daughter of the Kretshnif–Jerusalem Rebbe. His eldest son (from a previous marriage), Rabbi Yekusiel Yehudah Leifer, is the son-in-law of the Spinka Rebbe of Monsey, New York.

Rebbes of Pittsburgh
 Yosef Leifer (1924–1966)
 Avraham Abba Leifer (1966–1990)
 Mordechai Yissachar Ber Leifer (1990–2020)
 Meshulam Eliezer Leifer (2020– )

References

1979 births
Living people
Rebbes of Pittsburg
Hasidic rabbis in Israel
21st-century Israeli rabbis
American emigrants to Israel
American people of Hungarian-Jewish descent
Jewish American writers